Danny Bawa Chrisnanta (born 30 December 1988) is a retired Singaporean badminton player.

Career 
Danny competed at the 2014 and 2018 Commonwealth Games, where he captured a bronze medal in the mixed team and a silver medal in the men's doubles events in 2014. He is also the 2019 mixed doubles national champion with his partner Tan Wei Han.
Chrisnanta spent the later part of his career playing Men's Doubles with Andy Kwek. On 27 May 2022, he announced on his Instagram page that he had left the national team. The 2021 Southeast Asian Games was his final tournament, where he played Men's Doubles with Kwek in the Individual and Team events.

Personal life 
Born in Indonesia, Chrisnanta emigrated to Singapore in 2007 and became a citizen in 2013.

Achievements

Commonwealth Games 
Men's doubles

Southeast Asian Games 
Men's doubles

BWF Grand Prix (3 titles, 2 runners-up) 
The BWF Grand Prix had two levels, the Grand Prix and Grand Prix Gold. It was a series of badminton tournaments sanctioned by the Badminton World Federation (BWF) and played between 2007 and 2017.

Men's doubles

Mixed doubles

  BWF Grand Prix Gold tournament
  BWF Grand Prix tournament

BWF International Challenge/Series (13 titles, 19 runners-up) 
Men's doubles

Mixed doubles

  BWF International Challenge tournament
  BWF International Series tournament

References 

1988 births
Living people
People from Salatiga
Sportspeople from Central Java
Indonesian male badminton players
Indonesian emigrants to Singapore
Naturalised citizens of Singapore
Singaporean male badminton players
Badminton players at the 2014 Commonwealth Games
Badminton players at the 2018 Commonwealth Games
Commonwealth Games silver medallists for Singapore
Commonwealth Games bronze medallists for Singapore
Commonwealth Games medallists in badminton
Badminton players at the 2014 Asian Games
Asian Games competitors for Singapore
Competitors at the 2013 Southeast Asian Games
Competitors at the 2015 Southeast Asian Games
Competitors at the 2017 Southeast Asian Games
Competitors at the 2019 Southeast Asian Games
Competitors at the 2021 Southeast Asian Games
Southeast Asian Games bronze medalists for Singapore
Southeast Asian Games medalists in badminton
Medallists at the 2014 Commonwealth Games